Texas Quency Battle is an American film and television actor, known for his role as Marcus Forrester on the CBS soap opera The Bold and the Beautiful.

Career
In May 2008, Battle was cast on the CBS soap opera The Bold and the Beautiful playing a character named Marcus Forrester. The new actor comes onto the show as the first African American with an in-depth story line. The actor comments on the huge role as stating "It really does feel good that the writers/producers of the show, really have trust in me on bringing this new character to life. I'm happy to be a part of a show that really has a family feeling. Every one of my cast members is fun to work with. Makes you feel good to get up in the morning, and go to work doing something you love."

He is best known for his roles in the films Coach Carter, Final Destination 3, Wrong Turn 2: Dead End, and Dragonball Evolution. In 2010, he appeared in the remake of The Legend of Boggy Creek as Tommy Davis. Battle portrayed Dixon in the After Dark Originals flick The Task. Battle also co-stars in Death Valley, which airs on MTV.

Filmography

Television

Film

Awards and nominations

References

External links

Texas Battle Foundation website

1976 births
African-American male actors
American male film actors
American male television actors
Living people
Male actors from Houston
American male soap opera actors
21st-century African-American people
20th-century African-American people